Phạm Hùng Dũng (born 28 September 1978 in Đà Nẵng, Vietnam) is a retired Vietnamese football player. He was called up in the national team in 2002 and had participated in the AFC Asian Cup in 2007. He played for SHB Đà Nẵng and The Vissai Ninh Bình.

At 5:30 2 June 2011, he was stabbed at Glori Hotel (Nha Trang, Khánh Hòa). He was treated at Khánh Hòa province polyclinic hospital. At the afternoon in the same day, the police has started to investigate the incident.

International goals

References

External links

Living people
1978 births
Vietnamese footballers
Vietnam international footballers
2007 AFC Asian Cup players
People from Da Nang
SHB Da Nang FC players
V.League 1 players
Association football defenders